Ian McDougall (born 14 August 1954 in Baillieston) is a Scottish former professional football player who is best known for his time with Rangers and Dundee.

McDougall began his career at Pollok F.C. during which time he was one of the club's most prolific scorers scoring over 50 goals in one season. He then joined Rangers in 1973 where, for reasons not fully known they decided to play him as more of a midfielder rather than striker as he had been with Pollok, meaning he never replicated his high scoring at senior level. A two-year stay at Dundee followed in 1977 before brief spells with Berwick Rangers and Albion Rovers.

External links

1954 births
Living people
People from Baillieston
Rangers F.C. players
Dundee F.C. players
Berwick Rangers F.C. players
Albion Rovers F.C. players
Association football midfielders
Scottish footballers
Scottish Football League players
Scottish Junior Football Association players
Pollok F.C. players
Scotland under-23 international footballers
Footballers from Glasgow